Charruba-Timimi road is an asphalt road in the Cyrenaica region of eastern Libya running from Charruba to Taban, Mechili, and Timimi.

The Mechili-Timimi portion of the road was paved between the years 1975–1980.

The Charruba-At Taban-Mechili segment was paved between the years 1980–1985.

However, a shorter route between Tobruk and Benghazi along the Charruba-Abyar track measuring some  has not yet been paved.

References
Libyan Planning  Ministry, “Al Atlas al Watani lil Jamahiriya…”, Tripoli, 1978. 
“Al Atlas at Ta’limi …”, 1984. 

Roads in Libya
Cyrenaica